Kazhugu may refer to:
 Kazhugu (1981 film), directed by S. P. Muthuraman
 Kazhugu (2012 film), directed by Sathyasiva
 Kazhugu, a dubbed Tamil version of Sye (2004), directed by S. S. Rajamouli
 Kazhugu 2, an 2019 Tamil-language film